Earth Music is the second studio album by the American rock band The Youngbloods, released in 1967. The album did not succeed, failing to chart. 

Similar to their first album, the songs were a mix of originals and covers, ballads and rockers. Jesse Colin Young wrote three of the songs alone, the ballad "All My Dreams Blue", the hard rocking "Long and Tall", and the humorous "The Wine Song".  Jerry Corbitt contributed the ballad "Don't Play Games" which features a string section, and co-wrote "Dreamer's Dream" with Banana. "Fool Me", written by Banana, is a bass-heavy song more similar to "garage rock" of the middle 1960s than the folkier material normally associated with the Youngbloods.

Cover songs on the album include "Euphoria", a song originally done by the Holy Modal Rounders and written by George "Robin" Remailly (who later became a member of the Rounders). Other covers included two fifties classics, Chuck Berry's "Too Much Monkey Business" and Chuck Willis's "I Can Tell". Tim Hardin's "Reason to Believe " was one of the earliest cover versions of the popular ballad. "Sugar Babe," erroneously credited to Young/ Lomax, is a folk song about gambling and drinking that had been printed in American Ballads and Folk Songs, by John A. Lomax and his son Alan Lomax, published in 1934. In a note below "Sugar Babe," the Lomaxes state: "words and melody reprinted from the second volume of English Folk Songs of the Southern Appalachians, collected by Cecil Sharp, edited by Maud Karpeles."  That book was published in 1932.

Legacy

In a retrospective review for Allmusic, Lindsay Planer calls the album "a blend of captivating songwriting with an infectiously fun delivery" and feels that there are "a handful of equally definitive sides scattered throughout Earth Music."

Track listing

Side one
 "Euphoria" (George Remailly) – 2:15 (vocals by Jerry with Jesse)
 "All My Dreams Blue" (Jesse Colin Young) – 3:17 (vocals by Jesse with Jerry and Banana)
 "Monkey Business" (Chuck Berry) – 2:49 (vocals by Banana)
 "Dreamer's Dream" (Jerry Corbitt, Lowell Levinger) – 3:35 (vocals by Jerry and Jesse with Banana)
 "Sugar Babe" (Young, Lomax) – 2:08 (vocals by Jesse with Jerry)
 "Long and Tall" (Young) 4:05 (vocals by Jesse)

Side two
 "I Can Tell" (Chuck Willis) – 4:29 (vocals by Jesse)
 "Don't Play Games" (Corbitt) – 2:12 (vocals by Jerry with Jesse)
 "The Wine Song" (Young) – 2:24 (vocals by Jesse with Jerry and Banana)
 "Fool Me" (Levinger) – 2:57 (vocals by Banana with Jesse)
 "Reason to Believe" (Tim Hardin) – 2:25 (vocals by Jesse with Jerry)

Personnel
The Youngbloods
Jesse Colin Young – bass, vocals
Jerry Corbitt – guitar (lead on ""Fool Me"), harmonica, vocals
Lowell "Banana" Levinger – guitar, piano, finger cymbals on "Euphoria", pedal steel guitar on "Sugar Babe" and "Reason to Believe"
Joe Bauer – drums
Technical
Tracks 2, 3, 5, and 6 on Side 1, and track 5 on Side 2 were produced by The Youngbloods
Tracks 1-4 on Side 2 were produced by Felix Pappalardi
Tracks 1 and 4 on Side 1 were produced by Felix Pappalardi and the Youngbloods
Bob Cullen – production supervisor
Mike Moran – engineer
Mickey Crofford – engineer

References

External links
VH1 Biography: The Youngbloods
Jesse Colin Young official homepage

1967 albums
The Youngbloods albums
Albums produced by Felix Pappalardi
Albums produced by Jesse Colin Young
RCA Records albums